Khalid Rahman is an Indian film director who works in the Malayalam film Industry. He made his debut with the film Anuraga Karikkin Vellam. His other works include Unda, Love and Thallumaala.

Family
Noted director-cinematographer, Shyju Khalid, and cinematographer, Jimshi Khalid, are his brothers. Acotr V. P. Khalid is his father.

Career
He started his career in the Malayalam film industry as an assistant director in movies like Ustad Hotel, Sapthamashree Thaskaraha, Parava and Mayaanadhi and acted in these movies too.
His third film Love was shot during the pandemic lockdown and set indoors  which was released on OTT through Netflix.

Filmography

As actor

As Assistant Director

Awards

References

External links

Khalid Rahhman Instagram

Malayalam film directors
Living people
1993 births